Norman Loftis is an American poet, novelist and filmmaker, whose work has focused on the African-American experience, including his own upbringing in Chicago's South Side.

Works
Norman Loftis's first book of poems, Exiles and Voyages, was published in 1970 and was dedicated, "To my first friend, W.H. Auden.”

A later work, Black Anima, was published in 1973 by Liveright and describes an odyssey "from the Alamac Hotel on Upper Broadway through the underground of contemporary Europe to Queen Nefertiti's Egypt and back in search of black identity."

His films include Small Time (1990), which records lives of petty crime among young black men.  His  film Messenger (1994) tells the story of a bicycle courier in Manhattan. It is considered to be a remake of Vittorio De Sica's Bicycle Thieves.

References

African-American poets
20th-century American poets
Living people
Year of birth missing (living people)
20th-century African-American writers
21st-century African-American people